The Committee on Oversight and Accountability is the main investigative committee of the United States House of Representatives.

The committee's broad jurisdiction and legislative authority make it one of the most influential and powerful panels in the House. Its chair is one of only three in the House with the authority to issue subpoenas without a committee vote or consultation with the ranking member. However, in recent history, it has become practice to refrain from unilateral subpoenas.

Carolyn Maloney (D-New York) served as acting chair of the committee following the death of Elijah Cummings (D-Maryland) on October 17, 2019; she was elected chair a month later. Representative Jim Jordan served as ranking member from January 3, 2019, until March 12, 2020. On March 31, 2020, Jordan switched to become the ranking member of the Judiciary committee instead. Representative Mark Meadows served as ranking member from March 13, 2020, until March 30, 2020, when he resigned his congressional seat to become White House Chief of Staff. Representative James Comer (R-Kentucky) was selected to succeed Meadows on June 29, 2020. Comer became Chair when Republicans regained control of the House majority, with Representative Jamie Raskin (D-Maryland) being elected as Ranking Member. Politico reported in late January that Representative Alexandria Ocasio-Cortez (D-New York) would be appointed as the Vice Ranking Member.

History
The panel now known as the Committee on Oversight and Accountability was originally the Committee on Expenditures in the Executive Departments, created in 1927 to consolidate 11 separate Committees on Expenditures that had previously overseen the spending of various departments of the federal government.

The modern-day committee's immediate predecessor, the Committee on Government Operations, was established in 1952. The new name was intended to reflect the committee's broad mission: to oversee "the operations of Government activities at all levels with a view to determining their economy and efficiency".

After Republicans gained control of the House in the 1994 elections, the committee was reorganized to include seven subcommittees instead of 14. This reorganization consolidated the jurisdiction previously covered by three full committees and resulted in a 50 percent cut in staff. In 2007, a reorganization under a new Democratic majority combined the duties of the seven subcommittees into five.

In the 106th Congress, the panel was renamed the Committee on Government Reform. While retaining the agenda of the former Committee on Government Operations, the new committee also took on the responsibilities of the former House Committee on the Post Office and Civil Service and the Committee on the District of Columbia. On January 4, 2007, the 110th Congress renamed it the Committee on Oversight and Government Reform. The name was changed again by the 116th Congress to the Committee on Oversight and Reform. For the 118th Congress, Republicans changed the name to "Committee on Oversight and Accountability, which is the current iteration. Since 2007, it has simply been called the "Oversight Committee" for short.

Subpoena usage
In 1997, the Republican majority on the committee changed its rules to allow the chairman, Dan Burton (R-Indiana), to issue subpoenas without the consent of the committee's ranking Democrat. From 1997 to 2002, Burton used this authority to issue 1,052 unilateral subpoenas, many of them related to alleged misconduct by President Bill Clinton, at a cost of more than $35 million.

By contrast, from 2003 to 2005, under the chairmanship of Tom Davis (R-Virginia), the committee issued only three subpoenas to the Bush administration.

After Republicans retook the House in the 2010 elections, the new chairman, Darrell Issa (R-California), escalated the use of subpoenas again, issuing more than 100 in four years during the Obama administration. That was more than the combined total issued by the previous three chairmen—Davis, Henry Waxman (D-California), and Edolphus Towns (D-New York)—from 2003 to 2010.

Prominent hearings and investigations 
Between 2000 and 2006, many major events and scandals in the Bush administration generated few or no subpoenas from the Republican-led committee. These events included the September 11 attacks; the leaking of classified information identifying Central Intelligence Agency agent Valerie Plame; CIA-backed abuses at Abu Ghraib prison; the Bush administration claim that Iraq possessed weapons of mass destruction; illegal campaign contributions by lobbyists, including Jack Abramoff; deaths and damage due to the Federal Emergency Management Agency's weak response to Hurricane Katrina; and Philip Cooney's suppression of data demonstrating the existence of global warming. After the release of the Downing Street memo, which contained incriminating information on the buildup to the Iraq War, Democrats in the minority were refused a hearing chamber and were forced to meet in the basement of the United States Capitol.

However, under Davis's chairmanship from 2003 to 2007, the committee launched two controversial investigations. One of those investigations—triggered by the publication of Jose Canseco's memoir, Juiced—concerned the use of anabolic steroids by Major League Baseball players.

An inquiry was also made into the case of Terry Schiavo. In that investigation, which concerned the removal of a feeding tube from a woman in a persistent vegetative state, the committee issued a subpoena requiring Schiavo to "appear" so that members could "examine nutrition and hydration which incapacitated patients receive as part of their care". The apparent objective of this, beyond providing information to committee members, was to delay the pending withdrawal of life support from Schiavo, whose wishes were in dispute, while Congress considered legislation specifically targeted at her case. Members of the Democratic minority opposed the action. Chairman Davis said it was "a legitimate legislative inquiry".

The committee also investigated World Wrestling Entertainment's wellness and drug policies, amid speculation about a possible link between steroid use and the death of WWE performer Chris Benoit.

On July 8, 2009, committee Republicans released an investigative staff report discussing the financial crisis of 2007–2008. The report alleged that the government had caused the collapse by meddling in the United States' housing and lending market in the name of "affordable housing".

In February 2012, the committee held a hearing on the Patient Protection and Affordable Care Act's mandate that would "require all employers to cover birth control free of cost to women". Specifically, Republicans on the committee alleged that the Department of Health and Human Services's rules governing exemptions for religious institutions violated the Free Exercise Clause of the Constitution. The chairman, Darrell Issa, said the hearing was "meant to be more broadly about religious freedom and not specifically about the contraception mandate in the Health Reform law".

After Aaron Swartz committed suicide on January 11, 2013, the committee investigated the Justice Department's actions in prosecuting Swartz on hacking charges. On January 28, Issa and ranking member Elijah Cummings published a letter to Attorney General Eric Holder, questioning whether prosecutors had intentionally added felony counts to increase the amount of prison time Swartz faced.

On July 10, 2019, a hearing was held by the United States House Oversight Subcommittee on Civil Rights and Civil Liberties entitled "Kids in Cages: Inhumane Treatment at the Border" on the "inhumane treatment of children and families" inside child detention centers on the southern US border. Jamie Raskin (D-MD) chaired the session which included testimony from Yazmin Juarez, the mother of Mariee who died at the age of nineteen months while detained in a United States Immigration and Customs Enforcement (ICE) center in Dilley, Texas. In his opening statement Raskin said that "hundreds of thousands of people" have responded to the "harsh policies" by deciding to "migrate now before things get even worse".

Members, 118th Congress

Resolutions electing members:  (Chair),  (Ranking Member),  (R),  (D)

Subcommittees

Former Subcommittees
United States House Oversight Subcommittee on Civil Rights and Civil Liberties (116th Congress-117th Congress)
Dissolved by Chairman James Comer during the 118th Congress
United States House Oversight Subcommittee on Environment (115th Congress-117th Congress)
Dissolved by Chairman James Comer during the 118th Congress
United States House Oversight Subcommittee on Intergovernmental Affairs (115th Congress)
Dissolved by Chairman Elijah Cummings during the 116th Congress
United States House Oversight Subcommittee on Transportation and Public Assets (111th Congress-113th Congress)
Dissolved the end of the 114th United States Congress.

Chair

Historical membership rosters

117th Congress 

Sources: H.Res.9 (Chair), H.Res.10 (Ranking Member) H.Res.62 (D), H.Res.63 (R), H.Res.789 (Removing Paul Gosar), H.Res.825 (D - Shontel Brown), H.Res.1225 (R - Mike Flood)

116th Congress

Sources:  (Chair),  (Ranking Member),  (D),  (R)

Membership changes
The Oversight and Government Reform Committee underwent numerous membership changes over the course of the 116th United States Congress.
 July 10, 2019: Fred Keller (R-PA) added to committee roster. 
 October 17, 2019: Chairman Elijah Cummings (D-MD) passed away. Carolyn Maloney (D-NY) assumed acting Chairship.
 November 3, 2019: Vice Chair Katie Hill (D-CA) resigned.
 November 20, 2019: Carolyn Maloney elected permanent chair. 
 December 19, 2019: Katie Porter (D-CA) and Deb Haaland (D-NM) added to committee roster. 
 February 27, 2020: Ro Khanna (D-CA) added to committee roster, ranking after Harley Rouda. 
 March 21, 2020: Ranking Member Jim Jordan (R-OH) stepped down to assume the Ranking Membership of the Judiciary Committee; Mark Meadows (R-NC) assumes Ranking Membership.
 March 30, 2020: Mark Meadows (R-NC) resigned to become White House Chief of Staff. Jim Jordan resumes Ranking Membership temporarily.
 May 8, 2020: Kweisi Mfume (D-MD) added to committee roster, ranking after Harley Rouda. 
 June 29, 2020: James Comer (R-KY) elected permanent Ranking Member.
 July 1, 2020: Gary Palmer (R-AL) added to committee roster, ranking after Michael Cloud. 

Subcommittees

115th Congress

See also
 List of current United States House of Representatives committees

References

External links

House Oversight and Government Reform Committee (Archive)
House Oversight and Government Reform Committee. Legislation activity and reports, Congress.gov.
House Oversight and Government Reform Committee Hearings and Meetings Video. Congress.gov.
OMB Watch a government ethics and reform nonprofit agency
Plum Book, United States Government Policy Key Employees and Supporting Positions: About the Committee on Government Reform
 Records of the Government Operations Committee and its Predecessors at the National Archives and Records Administration

Oversight and Government Reform
1816 establishments in Washington, D.C.
Organizations established in 1816
Parliamentary committees on Justice